Horsfield's shrew (Crocidura horsfieldii) is a species of mammal in the family Soricidae found in Cambodia, China, India, Japan, Laos, Nepal, Bhutan,  Sri Lanka, Taiwan, Thailand, and Vietnam.

Its coloration is dusky brown above and dusky gray below. It differs from the pygmy shrew by larger size and blackish feet.

References

Crocidura
Mammals of Sri Lanka
Mammals of India
Mammals described in 1856
Taxonomy articles created by Polbot